On June 19, 2020, Canadian animal rights activist and protester Regan Russell was run over and killed by an animal transporter after a demonstration outside Sofina Foods Inc. subsidiary Fearman's Pork Inc., a pig slaughterhouse in Burlington, Ontario. The driver of the transporter was subsequently charged with careless driving causing death.

Background

Russell began campaigning for animal rights when she was 24 years old, with her first protest against seal culling taking place outside a government building in Winnipeg. In 1985, she read Animal Liberation: A New Ethics for Our Treatment of Animals and became a vegan. Russell was also an advocate for Black Lives Matter and women's rights. Filmed in 2012 while protesting against Marineland, Russell said, "People say we’re breaking the law by storming. How do you think women got the right? How do you think slavery was abolished? People stood up and broke the laws—because they're stupid laws." Russell was a member of Toronto Pig Save, a branch of the animal rights organization Animal Save Movement, which frequently organised demonstrations outside Canada's oldest pig slaughterhouse, Fearman's Pork Inc. in Burlington, a subsidiary of Sofina Foods Inc., owned by Michael Latifi. These demonstrations involved activists requesting transporters to wait outside the entrance to the premises for two minutes and filming themselves giving water to the slaughter-bound pigs through holes in the trailer.
On June 18, 2020, the Legislative Assembly of Ontario granted royal assent to a bill known as the Security from Trespass and Protecting Food Safety Act. A section of the bill, which would come into effect in September of the same year, would illegalize interference with animal transport without the consent of transporter drivers.

Death and legal proceedings
On the morning of June 19, 2020, Russell and six other activists from Toronto Pig Save held a pig-watering demonstration outside Fearman's Pork Inc. slaughterhouse. According to witnesses, the last transporter arrived at the slaughterhouse around 10:20 a.m., stopping in the inner lane of the roadway, instead of the lane nearer to the entrance to the premises. At the end of the demonstration, the transporter drove through the entrance. Russell, who had been standing in the crosswalk in front of the entrance during the demonstration and was possibly crossing the road, was run over by the transporter, which severed and dragged her body several yards. Russell bled to death before an ambulance arrived on the scene.

After an investigation, it was announced the following month that the driver was charged with the Highway Traffic Act offence of careless driving causing death, with authorities stating there was no indication of intent or crime in his action.

Aftermath 
Animal rights activists from around the world dedicated actions to Russell's memory such as die-ins outside the High Commission of Canada in London, England, a sit-in outside a slaughterhouse in Atena Lucana, Italy, a march and rally calling for justice for Russell in downtown Toronto, and a food distribution in Mumbai, India. A demonstration in California was attended by Joaquin Phoenix, who later joined other animal rights activists in a protest outside Fearman's Pork Inc. slaughterhouse. Speaking of Russell, Phoenix said, "While her tragic death has brought upon deep sorrow in the Animal Save community, we will honour her memory by vigorously confronting the cruelties she fought so hard to prevent by marching with Black Lives, protecting Indigenous rights, fighting for LGBTQ equality, and living a compassionate vegan life." On July 30, 2020, a pig-watering demonstration outside Fearman's Pork Inc. slaughterhouse was interrupted by counter-protesters, who tried to prevent the activists from giving water to pigs and held signs with derogatory references to Russell. Russell's death also became an issue in the protests and counter protests in Niagara-on-the-Lake about the use of horse-drawn carriages.

The Society for the Prevention of Cruelty to Animals's Hamilton/Burlington branch posthumously awarded Russell the Dr. Jean Rumny Award for commitment and dedication to animals. Activist Varun Virlan released a short film about Russell titled Killed For Compassion, which was shown at the 2020 International Vegan Film Festival. Shaun Monson, director of Earthlings, released a documentary about Russell titled There Was a Killing.

In March 2021, advocacy group Animal Justice sued the Ontario government over the Security from Trespass and Protecting Food Safety Act. In June 2022, Russell's widower filed a lawsuit against the transporter driver and the companies involved in the incident.

See also
 Anita Krajnc case
 Death of Jill Phipps
 List of animal rights advocates

References

External links 
 Regan Russell obituary

Animal rights protests
Deaths by person in Canada
June 2020 events in Canada
Protest-related deaths